Rally obedience (also known as Rally or Rally-O) is a dog sport based on obedience. It was originally devised by Charles L. "Bud" Kramer from the obedience practice of "doodling"—doing a variety of interesting warmup and freestyle exercises.  The doodles were usually parts of obedience exercises that taught the skills and improved performance and accuracy.

Unlike regular obedience, instead of waiting for the judge's orders, the competitors proceed around a course of designated stations with the dog in heel position. The course consists of 10 to 20 signs that instruct the team what to do.  Unlike traditional obedience, handlers are allowed to encourage their dogs during the course.

There are currently seven sanctioning bodies for Rally-O in the United States: the American Kennel Club (AKC); World Cynosport (formerly the Association of Pet Dog Trainers (APDT)); Canine Work and Games (C-Wags;) and Canines and Humans United (CHU).  The United Kennel Club (UKC) added rally obedience to their program as of January 2009, and the Swedish Working Dog Club (SBK) added it in July 2011.  International Canine Events (ICE) offers a Rallye Challenge title.  Australian Shepherd Club of America (ASCA) also has a rally program that is available to all breeds, including mixed breeds.

AKC Rally

In AKC Rally, which is open to AKC breeds and mixed breed dogs registered in the AKC Canine Partners program, the team starts with 100 points, and the judge deducts points for mistakes. Examples of errors include the dog leaving heel position when not cued to do so, the handler holding the leash too tightly, or miscounting steps on certain exercises.

After qualifying three times under at least two different judges, the dog earns a title, which appears after the dog's registered name. Each qualifying trial earned is known as a "leg".

There are five levels in AKC Rally:

Novice, the beginner's class. The dog is on leash and there are 10 to 15 stations. The title is RN.
Intermediate, an optional title for dogs who have completed their novice title but have not yet completed their advanced title. The dog is on leash and there are 12 to 17 stations of signs from the Novice and Advanced levels. The title is RI.
Advanced, for dogs who have completed their novice title. Dogs are judged off leash. The title is RA.
Excellent, for dogs who have earned their advanced title. 15 to 20 stations, including 2 jumps, are used in this class. The title is RE.
Master, the highest class, for dogs who have earned their excellent title, the title is RM, however this title requires 10 qualifying scores.

There are three higher titles. There is the Rally Advanced Excellent (RAE) title, in which the team has to qualify in both Advanced and Excellent in 10 trials. The highest title for most competitors is the Rally Championship title (RACH), in which the team has to qualify in Advanced, Excellent, and Master in the same trial at least 20 separate times and that earn the required championship points. Dogs and their handlers who meet the required qualifications have a chance to compete at the yearly Rally National Championship for the Rally National Champion (RNC) prefix title.

Other sanctioning bodies

In World Cynosport Rally, which is open to any dog and handler, the team starts with 200 points, and the judge deducts points for mistakes and adds up to 10 bonus points that can be earned for optional exercises.  There are three levels and there are additional titles for multiple qualifications at various levels, and several championship levels.  World Cynosport Rally varies in some respects in the performance of some of the exercises and has some exercises, such as a retrieve, not seen in AKC rally.  The most obvious difference between the two is the ability to reward the dog with food in the ring under specific conditions in World Cynosport rally.

UKC Rally follows a similar pattern as the AKC program.  There are three levels of competition, three legs are required for a title, and there is an extended championship title.  UKC rally is open to any dog and handler.  The exercises in UKC rally vary slightly from the other organizations, mostly involving which exercises are in each level.

C-Wags and CHU are relatively new organizations that appear to be mainly in the Mid-west.  It has added variations on rally courses, such as Zoom - which has no stationary signs, and requires 4 legs to title.

World Cynosport Rally has some trials in Canada, and Canada also has Canadian Association of Rally Obedience (CARO) and Canadian Kennel Club (CKC) Rally.  CARO is similar in many respects to both AKC and World Cynosport Rally, with the addition of some agility elements.  CKC Rally began in early 2007 and is similar to AKC Rally.

In the UK, Talking Dogs Rally (TD Rally) produced their own version which was launched in January 2010. For greater clarity, all signs have been redesigned and colour-coded: Level 1 = green, Level 2 = blue and Level 3 = yellow. Uniquely, to encourage teams (one dog and one handler) to compete against their own scores rather than against other teams, TD Rally does not designate competitors as first, second or third. Instead, teams gain Good, Outstanding and Ace rosettes for achieving scores over 170, 180 and 190 respectively (all teams start with 200 points.) Teams scoring over 181 points are included in the UK TD Rally National Rankings. As with other versions there are multiple opportunities for teams to win Titles including Puppy and Veteran. TD Rally put great emphasis on training their Judges in order to provide competitors with standardised, objective and fair judging throughout the UK.

In Italy, CSEN "Rally-Obedience" produced their version which was launched in September 2010.
In CSEN Rally-Obedience, which is open to any dog and handler, the team starts with 200 points, and the judge deducts points for mistakes. There are three levels and there are additional titles for multiple qualifications at various levels. Another there are levels for puppy, junior handler, veteran and novice. There are three types of title, gold, silver and bronze. Teams scoring over 170 points are included in the CSEN Rally National Rankings. CSEN Rally-Obedience is managed by the CSEN (sports promotion organisation officially recognised by the olympic committee CONI).

In Switzerland, Rally Obedience has existed since 2002, the last rules from 2008 are based on the work of Bud Kramer and the APDT and were updated in 2012.

In Australia, Rally Obedience was adopted by the Australian National Kennel Council in 2012.  Australian Rally Obedience has 4 levels: Novice, Advanced, Excellent and Masters.

Novice is performed on lead and all other classes are performed off lead.  There is also provision for Rally Obedience Champion in Australian Rally Obedience.

References

External links

   Rally-O - The UK's #1 for Rally-O Products
AKC Rally Regulations
  Canis Major rally overview
World Cynosport Rally
  C-Wags Rally
 CHU Rally
  UKC Rally
  CARO Rally
  CKC homepage - search the events for upcoming rally events
Talking Dogs Rally
UK Rally APDT UK
   UK Rally frames
    Rally classes Hertfordshire
http://www.rally-obedience.com
Australian National Kennel Council
CSEN Rally-Obedience (Italy)

Dog sports